Weeksville may refer to:
 Weeksville, Brooklyn, New York, United States
Weeksville, Montana, United States
Weeksville, North Carolina, United States